Pure Romance is a United States-based multi-level marketing company that sells adult products including sex toys. Under the multi-level marketing (MLM) model, all products are sold exclusively through independent consultants at women-only at-home parties.

History 

Patty Brisben, a former pediatrician's assistant, founded the company Slumber Parties in Loveland, Ohio 1993. Her business used contract salespeople to sell sex toys, lotions, and massage oils through at-home parties. In 2000, the company had six full-time employees and had annual sales of less than $2 million.

Brisben's son, Chris Cicchinelli, joined the company in 2000 and encouraged his mother to expand beyond local sales into markets such as St. Louis, Missouri. By 2003 the company had $30 million in sales, 3,500 consultants, and was active in 46 US states and the US Virgin Islands. The company was renamed Pure Romance in 2003.

In 2011, the Pure Romance expanded into South Africa and Australia. In 2012, Cicchinelli took over the position of President and CEO while Brisben stayed on as chair of the company. At this time the company reported to have $100 million in annual sales and 75,000 consultants, building on the popularity of the recently published erotic romance novel 50 Shades of Grey.

In February 2014, the company moved its headquarters to downtown Cincinnati, Ohio.

In 2014 Pure Romance purchased Slumber Parties, Baton Rouge, Louisiana, based multi-level marketing company which sold similar products. In 2016 the company purchased Passion Parties, another competing multi-level marketing company with a similar product line, expanding the company into the Canadian market.

In January 2016, Pure Romance, among other MLM’s, entered into an agreement with the State of Hawaii’s Department of Taxation to obtain a single general excise license and become the represented tax collection agent on behalf of its direct sellers.

The company reported $217.92 million in sales in 2017 and claims to have more than 30,000 consultants. In 2018, it reported $237 million in sales.

Criticism 
The MLM model has been criticized since the overwhelming majority of participants (most sources estimated to be over 99.25% of all MLM distributors) participate at either an insignificant or nil net profit. Indeed, the largest proportion of participants must operate at a net loss (after expenses are deducted) so that the few individuals in the uppermost level of the MLM pyramid can derive their significant earnings. Said earnings are then emphasized by the MLM company to all other participants to encourage their continued participation at a continuing financial loss. 

In particular, Pure Romance has been criticized for targeting military spouses in the United States, who often have trouble finding traditional employment, since they have to move frequently for their spouses' careers.

See also 

 List of multi-level marketing companies

References

External links 

 Official website

Multi-level marketing companies
Direct sales companies
Companies established in 1993
Personal selling